These genera belong to Cirripedia, a subclass of barnacles in the phylum of Crustacea, as classified by Chan et al. (2021) and the World Register of Marine Species. Their classification into order, superfamily, family, and subfamily is included.

Cirripedia genera
 Infraclass Acrothoracica Gruvel, 1905
 Order Cryptophialida Kolbasov, Newman & Hoeg, 2009
 Family Cryptophialidae Gerstaecker, 1866
 Genus Australophialus Tomlinson, 1969
 Genus Cryptophialus Darwin, 1854
 Order Lithoglyptida Kolbasov, Newman & Hoeg, 2009
 Family Lithoglyptidae Aurivillius, 1892
 Subfamily Berndtiinae Utinomi, 1950
 Genus Berndtia Utinomi, 1950
 Genus Weltneria Berndt, 1907
 Subfamily Kochlorininae Gruvel, 1905
 Genus Kochlorine Noll, 1872
 Genus Kochlorinopsis Stubbings, 1967
 Subfamily Lithoglyptinae Aurivillius, 1892
 Genus Auritoglyptes Kolbasov & Newman, 2005
 Genus Balanodytes Utinomi, 1950
 Genus Lithoglyptes Aurivillius, 1892
 Family Trypetesidae Stebbing, 1910
 Genus Tomlinsonia Turquier, 1985
 Genus Trypetesa Norman, 1903
 Infraclass Rhizocephala Müller, 1862
 Family Chthamalophilidae Bocquet-Védrine, 1961
 Genus Bocquetia Pawlik, 1987
 Genus Boschmaella Bocquet-Védrine, 1968
 Genus Chthamalophilus Bocquet-Védrine, 1957
 Family Clistosaccidae Boschma, 1928
 Genus Clistosaccus Lilljeborg, 1861
 Genus Sylon M. Sars, 1870
 Family Duplorbidae Høeg & Rybakov, 1992
 Genus Arcturosaccus Rybakov & Høeg, 1992
 Genus Cryptogaster Bocquet-Védrine & Bourdon, 1984
 Genus Duplorbis Smith, 1906
 Family Mycetomorphidae Høeg & Rybakov, 1992
 Genus Mycetomorpha Potts, 1912
 Family Parthenopeidae Rybakov & Høeg, 2013
 Genus Parthenopea Kossmann, 1874
 Family Peltogasterellidae Høeg & Glenner in Høeg, Noever, Rees, Crandall & Glenner, 2019
 Genus Angulosaccus Reinhard, 1944
 Genus Boschmaia Reinhard, 1958
 Genus Cyphosaccus Reinhard, 1958
 Genus Peltogasterella Krüger, 1912
 Family Peltogastridae Lilljeborg, 1861
 Genus Briarosaccus Boschma, 1930
 Genus Dipterosaccus Van Kampen & Boschma, 1925
 Genus Galatheascus Boschma, 1929
 Genus Lernaeodiscus Müller, 1862
 Genus Ommatogaster Yoshida & Osawa in Yoshida, Osawa, Hirose & Hirose, 2011
 Genus Paratriangulus Høeg & Glenner in Høeg, Noever, Rees, Crandall & Glenner, 2019
 Genus Peltogaster Rathke, 1842
 Genus Pterogaster Van Baal, 1937
 Genus Septodiscus Van Baal, 1937
 Genus Septosaccus Duboscq, 1912
 Genus Temnascus Boschma, 1951
 Genus Tortugaster Reinhard, 1948
 Genus Trachelosaccus Boschma, 1928
 Genus Triangulopsis Guérin-Ganivet, 1911
 Family Pirusaccidae Høeg & Glenner in Høeg, Noever, Rees, Crandall & Glenner, 2019
 Genus Pirusaccus Lützen, 1985
 Family Polyascidae Høeg & Glenner in Høeg, Noever, Rees, Crandall & Glenner, 2019
 Genus Parasacculina Høeg & Glenner in Høeg, Noever, Rees, Crandall & Glenner, 2019
 Genus Polyascus Glenner, Lützen & Takahashi, 2003
 Family Polysaccidae Lützen & Takahashi, 1996
 Genus Polysaccus Høeg & Lützen, 1993
 Family Sacculinidae Lilljeborg, 1861
 Genus Drepanorchis Boschma, 1927
 Genus Heterosaccus Smith, 1906
 Genus Loxothylacus Boschma, 1928
 Genus Ptychascus Boschma, 1933
 Genus Sacculina Thompson, 1836
 Genus Sesarmaxenos Annandale, 1911
 Family Thompsoniidae Høeg & Rybakov, 1992
 Genus Diplothylacus Høeg & Lützen, 1993
 Genus Jensia Boyko & Williams in Hiller, Williams & Boyko, 2015
 Genus Thompsonia Kossmann, 1872
 Genus Thylacoplethus Coutière, 1902
 Family Triangulidae Høeg & Glenner in Høeg, Noever, Rees, Crandall & Glenner, 2019
 Genus Triangulus Smith, 1906
 Infraclass Thoracica Darwin, 1854
 Superorder Phosphatothoracica Gale, 2019
 Order Iblomorpha Buckeridge & Newman, 2006
 Family Iblidae Leach, 1825
 Subfamily Iblinae Leach, 1825
 Genus Ibla Leach, 1825
 Subfamily Neoiblinae Buckeridge & Newman, 2006
 Genus Neoibla Buckeridge & Newman, 2006
 Family Idioiblidae Buckeridge & Newman, 2006
 Subfamily Chaetolepadinae Buckeridge & Newman, 2006
 Genus Chaetolepas Studer, 1889
 Genus Chitinolepas Buckeridge & Newman, 2006
 Subfamily Idioiblinae Buckeridge & Newman, 2006
 Genus Idioibla Buckeridge & Newman, 2006
 Order †Eolepadomorpha Chan et al., 2021
 Family †Eolepadidae Buckeridge, 1983
 Genus †Eolepas Withers, 1928
 Genus †Toarcolepas Gale & Schweigert, 2015
 Family †Praelepadidae Chernyshev, 1930
 Genus †Illilepas Schram, 1986
 Genus †Praelepas Chernyshev, 1930
 Superorder Thoracicalcarea Gale, 2015
 Order Balanomorpha Pilsbry, 1916
 Superfamily Balanoidea Leach, 1817
 Family Balanidae Leach, 1817
 Subfamily Acastinae Kolbasov, 1993
 Genus Acasta Leach, 1817
 Genus Archiacasta Kolbasov, 1993
 Genus Euacasta Kolbasov, 1993
 Genus Neoacasta Kolbasov, 1993
 Genus Pectinoacasta Kolbasov, 1993
 Subfamily Amphibalaninae Pitombo, 2004
 Genus Amphibalanus Pitombo, 2004
 Genus Fistulobalanus Zullo, 1984
 Genus Tetrabalanus Cornwall, 1941
 Subfamily Archaeobalaninae Newman & Ross, 1976
 Genus Actinobalanus Moroni, 1967
 Genus Armatobalanus Hoek, 1913
 Genus Bathybalanus Hoek, 1913
 Genus Chirona Gray, 1835
 Genus Conopea Say, 1822
 Genus Hesperibalanus Pilsbry, 1916
 Genus Membranobalanus Hoek, 1913
 Genus Notobalanus Newman & Ross, 1976
 Genus Solidobalanus Hoek, 1913
 Genus Striatobalanus Hoek, 1913
 Genus †Archaeobalanus Menesini, 1971
 Genus †Kathpalmeria Ross, 1965
 Genus †Palaeobalanus Buckeridge, 1983
 Genus †Zullobalanus Buckeridge, 1989
 Subfamily Balaninae Leach, 1817
 Genus Balanus Costa, 1778
 Genus Tamiosoma Conrad, 1857
 Genus Zulloa Ross & Newman, 1996
 Subfamily Bryozobiinae Ross & Newman, 1996
 Genus Bryozobia Ross & Newman, 1996
 Genus Eoatria Van Syoc & Newman, 2010
 Genus Microporatria Van Syoc & Newman, 2010
 Genus Multatria Van Syoc & Newman, 2010
 Genus Poratria Van Syoc & Newman, 2010
 Subfamily Concavinae Zullo, 1992
 Genus Arossia Newman, 1982
 Genus Chesaconcavus Zullo, 1992
 Genus Concavus Newman, 1982
 Genus Menesiniella Newman, 1982
 Genus Paraconcavus Zullo, 1992
 Genus Perforatus Pitombo, 2004
 Genus †Alessandriella Carriol & Cahuzac, 2001
 Genus †Zulloconcavus Carriol, 2000
 Subfamily Hexacreusiinae Zullo in Newman, 1996
 Genus Hexacreusia Zullo, 1961
 Genus Zulloana Pitombo & Ross, 2002
 Subfamily Megabalaninae Leach, 1817
 Genus Austromegabalanus Newman, 1979
 Genus Fosterella Buckeridge, 1983
 Genus Megabalanus Hoek, 1913
 Genus Notomegabalanus Newman, 1979
 Genus Pseudoacasta Nilsson-Cantell, 1930
 Genus Tasmanobalanus Buckeridge, 1983
 Genus †Paractinobalanus Carriol, 2008
 Genus †Porobalanus Buckeridge, 2015
 Subfamily Semibalaninae Newman & Ross, 1976
 Genus Semibalanus Pilsbry, 1916
 Subfamily Wanellinae Chan et al., 2021
 Genus Wanella Anderson, 1993
 Family Pyrgomatidae Gray, 1825
 Subfamily Ceratoconchinae Newman & Ross, 1976
 Genus Ceratoconcha Kramberger-Gorjanovic, 1889
 Genus †Eoceratoconcha Newman & Ladd, 1974
 Subfamily Megatrematinae Holthuis, 1982
 Genus Adna Sowerby, 1823
 Genus Megatrema Sowerby, 1823
 Genus Memagreta Ross & Pitombo, 2002
 Genus Pyrgomina Baluk & Radwanski, 1967
 Subfamily Pyrgomatinae Gray, 1825
 Genus Ahoekia Ross & Newman, 1995
 Genus Arossella Anderson, 1993
 Genus Australhoekia Ross & Newman, 2000
 Genus Cantellius Ross & Newman, 1973
 Genus Cionophorus Ross & Newman, 2001
 Genus Creusia Leach, 1817
 Genus Darwiniella Anderson, 1992
 Genus Eohoekia Ross & Newman, 1995
 Genus Galkinius Perreault, 2014
 Genus Hiroa Ross & Newman, 1973
 Genus Hoekia Ross & Newman, 1973
 Genus Neopyrgoma Ross & Newman, 2002
 Genus Neotrevathana Ross, 1999
 Genus Nobia Sowerby, 1839
 Genus Parahoekia Ross & Newman, 1995
 Genus Pyrgoma Leach, 1817
 Genus Pyrgopsella Zullo, 1967
 Genus Pyrgospongia Achituv & Simon-Blecher, 2006
 Genus Savignium Leach, 1825
 Genus Trevathana Anderson, 1992
 Superfamily Chthamaloidea Darwin, 1854
 Family Catophragmidae Utinomi, 1968
 Genus Catolasmus Ross & Newman, 2001
 Genus Catomerus Pilsbry, 1916
 Genus Catophragmus Sowerby, 1826
 Family Chionelasmatidae Buckeridge, 1983
 Genus Chionelasmus Pilsbry, 1911
 Genus Eochionelasmus Yamaguchi, 1990
 Family Chthamalidae Darwin, 1854
 Genus Caudoeuraphia Poltarukha, 1997
 Genus Chamaesipho Darwin, 1854
 Genus Chinochthamalus Foster, 1980
 Genus Chthamalus Ranzani, 1817
 Genus Euraphia Conrad, 1837
 Genus Hexechamaesipho Poltarukha, 1996
 Genus Jehlius Ross, 1971
 Genus Microeuraphia Poltarukha, 1997
 Genus Nesochthamalus Foster & Newman, 1987
 Genus Notochthamalus Foster & Newman, 1987
 Genus Octomeris Sowerby, 1825
 Genus Pseudoeuraphia Poltarukha, 2000
 Genus Rehderella Foster & Newman, 1987
 Genus Tetrachthamalus Newman, 1967
 Family Pachylasmatidae Utinomi, 1968
 Subfamily Eolasmatinae Buckeridge, 1983
 Genus Eolasma Buckeridge, 1983
 Genus Neoeolasma Gale, 2020
 Subfamily Metalasmatinae Jones, 2000
 Genus Metalasma Jones, 2000
 Subfamily Pachylasmatinae Utinomi, 1968
 Genus Atetrapachylasma Newman & Jones, 2011
 Genus Eurylasma Jones, 2000
 Genus Eutomolasma Jones, 2000
 Genus Microlasma Jones, 2000
 Genus Pachylasma Darwin, 1854
 Genus Pseudoctomeris Poltarukha, 1996
 Genus Tetrapachylasma Foster, 1988
 Family Waikalasmatidae Ross & Newman, 2001
 Genus Waikalasma Buckeridge, 1983
 Superfamily Coronuloidea Leach, 1817
 Family Austrobalanidae Newman & Ross, 1976
 Genus Austrobalanus Pilsbry, 1916
 Family Bathylasmatidae Newman & Ross, 1971
 Subfamily Bathylasmatinae Newman & Ross, 1971
 Genus Bathylasma Newman & Ross, 1971
 Genus Mesolasma Foster, 1981
 Genus Tetrachaelasma Newman & Ross, 1971
 Genus †Tessarelasma Withers, 1936
 Subfamily Hexelasmatinae Newman & Ross, 1976
 Genus Hexelasma Hoek, 1913
 Family Chelonibiidae Pilsbry, 1916
 Subfamily Chelonibiinae Pilsbry, 1916
 Genus Chelonibia Leach, 1817
 Genus Stephanolepas Fischer, 1886
 Subfamily †Protochelonibiinae Harzhauser & Newman, 2011
 Genus †Protochelonibia Harzhauser & Newman, 2011
 Family Coronulidae Leach, 1817
 Genus Cetolepas Zullo, 1969
 Genus Cetopirus Ranzani, 1817
 Genus Chelolepas Ross & Frick, 2007
 Genus Coronula Lamarck, 1802
 Genus Cryptolepas Dall, 1872
 Genus Cylindrolepas Pilsbry, 1916
 Genus Platylepas Gray, 1825
 Genus Stomatolepas Pilsbry, 1910
 Genus Tubicinella Lamarck, 1802
 Genus Xenobalanus Steenstrup, 1852
 Genus †Emersonius Ross, 1967
 Family Tetraclitidae Gruvel, 1903
 Genus Astroclita Ren & Liu, 1979
 Genus Epopella Ross, 1970
 Genus Lissaclita Gomez-Daglio & Van Syoc, 2006
 Genus Neonrosella Jones, 2010
 Genus Newmanella Ross, 1969
 Genus Tesseropora Pilsbry, 1916
 Genus Tetraclita Schumacher, 1817
 Genus Tetraclitella Hiro, 1939
 Genus Yamaguchiella Ross & Perreault, 1999
 Genus †Tesseroplax Ross, 1969
 Superfamily Elminioidea Chan et al., 2021
 Family Elminiidae Foster, 1982
 Genus Austrominius Buckeridge, 1983
 Genus Elminius Leach, 1825
 Genus Hexaminius Foster, 1982
 Genus Protelminius Buckeridge & Newman, 2010
 Genus †Matellonius Buckeridge, 1983
 Superfamily †Pachydiadematoidea Chan et al., 2021
 Family †Pachydiadematidae Chan et al., 2021
 Genus †Pachydiadema Withers, 1935
 Order Calanticomorpha Chan et al., 2021
 Family Calanticidae Zevina, 1978
 Genus Aurivillialepas Newman, 1980
 Genus Calantica Gray, 1825
 Genus Crosnieriella Jones, 1998
 Genus Euscalpellum Hoek, 1907
 Genus Gruvelialepas Newman, 1980
 Genus Newmanilepas Zevina & Yakhontova, 1987
 Genus Paracalantica (Utinomi, 1949)
 Genus Pisiscalpellum Utinomi, 1958
 Genus Scillaelepas Seguenza, 1872
 Genus Smilium Gray, 1825
 Genus †Pachyscalpellum Buckeridge, 1991
 Genus †Zeascalpellum Buckeridge, 1983
 Family †Cretiscalpellidae Buckeridge, 1983
 Genus †Cretiscalpellum Withers, 1922
 Genus †Jagtscalpellum Gale, 2020
 Genus †Striascalpellum Gale, 2020
 Genus †Witherscalpellum Gale, 2020
 Family †Titanolepadidae Gale & Sørensen, 2015
 Genus †Ivoelepas Gale & Sørensen, 2015
 Genus †Levelepas Gale & Sørensen, 2015
 Genus †Titanolepas Withers, 1913
 Order Pollicipedomorpha Chan et al., 2021
 Family Lithotryidae Gruvel, 1905
 Genus Lithotrya Sowerby, 1822
 Family Pollicipedidae Leach, 1817
 Genus Anelasma Darwin, 1852
 Genus Capitulum Gray, 1825
 Genus Pollicipes Leach, 1817
 Family †Zeugmatolepadidae Newman, 1996
 Subfamily †Martillepadinae Gale, 2014
 Genus †Concinnalepas Gale, 2014
 Genus †Etcheslepas Gale, 2014
 Genus †Icenilepas Gale, 2014
 Genus †Litholepas Nagler, Haug, Glenner & Buckeridge, 2017
 Genus †Martillepas Gale, 2014
 Genus †Subsecolepas Gale, 2020
 Genus †Texaslepas Gale, 2020
 Subfamily †Zeugmatolepadinae Newman, 1996
 Genus †Aporolepas Withers, 1953
 Genus †Tetrinus Hirt, 1992
 Genus †Zeugmatolepas Withers, 1913
 Order Scalpellomorpha Buckeridge & Newman, 2006
 Superfamily Lepadoidea Chan et al., 2021
 Family Heteralepadidae Nilsson-Cantell, 1921
 Genus Alepas Rang, 1829
 Genus Heteralepas Pilsbry, 1907
 Genus Koleolepas Stebbing, 1900
 Genus Paralepas Pilsbry, 1907
 Family Lepadidae Darwin, 1852
 Genus Conchoderma von Olfers, 1814
 Genus Dosima Gray, 1825
 Genus Hyalolepas Annandale, 1906
 Genus Lepas Linnaeus, 1758
 Genus †Pristinolepas Buckeridge, 1983
 Family Malacolepadidae Hiro, 1937
 Genus Arcalepas Jones & Morton, 2009
 Genus Malacolepas Hiro, 1933
 Family Poecilasmatidae Annandale, 1909
 Genus Dianajonesia Koçak & Kemal, 2008
 Genus Dichelaspis Darwin, 1852
 Genus Glyptelasma Pilsbry, 1907
 Genus Megalasma Hoek, 1883
 Genus Microlepas Hoek, 1907
 Genus Minyaspis Van Syoc & Dekelboum, 2011
 Genus Octolasmis Gray, 1825
 Genus Oxynaspis Darwin, 1852
 Genus Pagurolepas Stubbings, 1940
 Genus Poecilasma Darwin, 1852
 Genus Rugilepas Grygier & Newman, 1991
 Genus Scleraspis Van Syoc & Dekelboum, 2012
 Genus Trilasmis Hinds, 1844
 Genus †Archoxynaspis Van Syoc & Dekelboum, 2011
 Family Rhizolepadidae Zevina, 1980
 Genus Rhizolepas Day, 1939
 Superfamily Neolepadoidea Chan et al., 2021
 Family Neobrachylepadidae Newman & Yamaguchi, 1995
 Genus Neobrachylepas Newman & Yamaguchi, 1995
 Family Neolepadidae Yamaguchi, Newman & Hashimoto, 2004
 Genus Ashinkailepas Yamaguchi, Newman & Hashimoto, 2004
 Genus Leucolepas Southward & Jones, 2003
 Genus Neolepas Newman, 1979
 Genus Vulcanolepas Southward & Jones, 2003
 Genus †Stipilepas Carriol, 2016
 Family Neoverrucidae Newman, 1989 in Hessler & Newman, 1989
 Genus Imbricaverruca Newman, 2000
 Genus Neoverruca Newman in Hessler & Newman, 1989
 Family Probathylepadidae Ren & Sha, 2015
 Genus Probathylepas Ren & Sha, 2015
 Superfamily Scalpelloidea Chan et al., 2021
 Family Scalpellidae Pilsbry, 1907
 Subfamily Amigdoscalpellinae Gale, 2015
 Genus Amigdoscalpellum Zevina, 1978
 Genus Catherinum Zevina, 1978
 Genus Weltnerium Zevina, 1978
 Subfamily Brochiinae Zevina, 1978
 Genus Australscalpellum Newman & Ross, 1971
 Genus Brochia Newman & Ross, 1971
 Subfamily Meroscalpellinae Zevina, 1978
 Genus Abathescalpellum Newman & Ross, 1971
 Genus Alcockianum Zevina, 1978
 Genus Annandaleum Newman & Ross, 1971
 Genus Gymnoscalpellum Newman & Ross, 1971
 Genus Hamatoscalpellum Zevina, 1978
 Genus Litoscalpellum Newman & Ross, 1971
 Genus Meroscalpellum Zevina, 1978
 Genus Neoscalpellum Pilsbry, 1907
 Subfamily Scalpellinae Pilsbry, 1907
 Genus Arcoscalpellum Hoek, 1907
 Genus Diotascalpellum Gale, 2015
 Genus Graviscalpellum Foster, 1980
 Genus Regioscalpellum Gale, 2015
 Genus Scalpellum Leach, 1818
 Genus Zevinaella Shalaeva & Newman, 2016
 Genus †Arcuatoscalpellum Gale, 2015
 Genus †Jaegerscalpellum Gale, 2019
 Subfamily Scalpellopsinae Zevina, 1978
 Genus Scalpellopsis Broch, 1921
 Subfamily Virgiscalpellinae Gale, 2020
 Genus †Collinslepas Gale, 2020
 Genus †Virgilepas Gale, 2020
 Genus †Virgiscalpellum Withers, 1935
 Family †Proverrucidae Newman, 1989 in Hessler & Newman, 1989
 Genus †Proverruca Withers, 1914
 Order Verrucomorpha Pilsbry, 1916
 Family Verrucidae Darwin, 1854
 Genus Altiverruca Pilsbry, 1916
 Genus Brochiverruca Zevina, 1993
 Genus Cameraverruca Pilsbry, 1916
 Genus Costatoverruca Young, 1998
 Genus Cristallinaverruca Young, 2002
 Genus Gibbosaverruca Young, 2002
 Genus Globuloverruca Young, 2004
 Genus Metaverruca Pilsbry, 1916
 Genus Newmaniverruca Young, 1998
 Genus Rostratoverruca Broch, 1922
 Genus Spongoverruca Zevina, 1987
 Genus Verruca Schumacher, 1817
 Genus †Priscoverruca Gale, 2014
 Genus †Youngiverruca Gale, 2014
 Family †Eoverrucidae Gale, 2020
 Genus †Eoverruca Withers, 1935
 Order †Archaeolepadomorpha Chan et al., 2021
 Family †Archaeolepadidae Gale, 2019
 Genus †Archaeolepas von Zittel, 1884
 Genus †Loriolepas Gale, 2015
 Family †Myolepadidae Gale, 2015 in Gale & Sørensen, 2015
 Genus †Bosquetlepas Gale & Sørensen, 2015
 Genus †Myolepas Gale & Sørensen, 2015
 Family †Stramentidae Withers, 1920
 Subfamily †Loriculinae Gale, 2015
 Genus †Blastolepas Drushchits & Zevina, 1969
 Genus †Loriculina Dames, 1885
 Genus †Metaloriculina Gale, 2015
 Subfamily †Stramentinae Withers, 1920
 Genus †Angulatergum Hauschke, 1994
 Genus †Leweslepas Gale, 2015
 Genus †Parastramentum Gale, 2015
 Genus †Stramentum Logan, 1897
 Order †Brachylepadomorpha Withers, 1923
 Family †Brachylepadidae Woodward, 1901
 Genus †Brachylepas Woodward, 1901
 Genus †Epibrachylepas Gale, 2014
 Genus †Fallaxlepas Gale, 2020
 Genus †Faxelepas Gale, 2014
 Genus †Parabrachylepas Gale, 2014
 Genus †Pedupycnolepas Gale, 2014
 Genus †Pycnolepas Withers, 1914

References

Cirripedia